The FA Cup is an association football competition contested between English clubs since 1872. English manager Charles W. Alcock led Wanderers to success in the inaugural final in 1872 and repeated the feat the following season. Arsène Wenger has won the tournament on seven occasions as Arsenal manager. 

Eighteen men have won the tournament both as a player and as a manager: John Cameron as player-manager in 1901, Peter McWilliam, Billy Walker, Jimmy Seed, Matt Busby, Stan Seymour, Joe Smith, Bill Shankly, Joe Mercer, Don Revie, Bob Stokoe, Kenny Dalglish, Bobby Gould, Terry Venables, George Graham, Gianluca Vialli, Roberto Di Matteo and Mikel Arteta. Cameron and Dalglish are the only two people who have guided their clubs to the title as player-managers, in 1901 and 1986 respectively. Two managers have won the title with multiple sides, Billy Walker won as manager of Sheffield Wednesday in 1935 and Nottingham Forest in 1959, and Herbert Chapman won as manager of Huddersfield Town in 1922 and Arsenal in 1930. James Fielding and Jarvis Kenrick have both won the most consecutive finals with 3 each, Kenrick with Wanderers in 1876, 1877 and 1878, and Fielding with Blackburn Rovers in 1884, 1885 and 1886.

By year

Managers with multiple titles

By nationality

See also 

 List of FA Cup finals
 History of FA Cup

References

FA Cup
 
FA Cup